Michael Anthony Reed  (2 June 1945 – 24 November 2020) was an Australian politician.

Career

|}
He was the Country Liberal Party member for Katherine in the Northern Territory Legislative Assembly from 1987 to 2003. He was Deputy Chief Minister in the governments of Shane Stone and Denis Burke; following the CLP's election loss in 2001, he resigned in 2003.

Reed was made a Member of the Order of Australia (AM) in the 2005 Australia Day Honours for "service to the Northern Territory Parliament and to the community of Katherine".

Reed died aged 75 on 24 November 2020.

References

1945 births
2020 deaths
Members of the Northern Territory Legislative Assembly
Country Liberal Party members of the Northern Territory Legislative Assembly
Deputy Chief Ministers of the Northern Territory
Treasurers of the Northern Territory
21st-century Australian politicians
Members of the Order of Australia